San Gregorio Matese is a comune (municipality) in the Province of Caserta in the Italian region Campania, located about  north of Naples and about  north of Caserta.

San Gregorio Matese borders the following municipalities: Bojano, Campochiaro, Castello del Matese, Letino, Piedimonte Matese, Raviscanina, Roccamandolfi, San Massimo, San Polo Matese, Sant'Angelo d'Alife, Valle Agricola.

References

Cities and towns in Campania